Succivo is a comune (municipality) in the Province of Caserta in the Italian region Campania, located about  north of Naples and about  southwest of Caserta.

Succivo borders the following municipalities: Cesa, Gricignano di Aversa, Marcianise, Orta di Atella, Sant'Arpino.

References

External links
 Official website

Cities and towns in Campania